Mihir Mishra is an Indian television actor. He is well-known for his role of Dr. Rahul Mehra in Star Plus's show Sanjivani.

Career
Mishra made his television debut with Star Plus's show Sanjivani, where he played the lead role of Dr. Rahul Mehra. After that he did various TV shows like Kumkum, Saat Phere - Saloni Ka Safar, Dil Se Diya Vachan, Ek Nayi Chhoti Si Zindagi. He was also the contestant of Nach Baliye 1. He has also done some episodic roles in C.I.D. and Adaalat. He was last seen in Dil Dosti Dance as Reyaansh's father on Channel V India. He played the role of Akash Roy in Star Plus's Ek Hasina Thi. Mihir Mishra played the role of Rohit who is Pooja's husband opposite Riva Bubber in BSNL Cellone. He played the role of a senior doctor whose name is Dr. Sinha in Zindagi Wins on Bindass. He did various TV commercials such as Red Tape, Sony Handycam, Sunsilk, BSNL, VICCO, MC Cain Foods India and Tata AIA Life. He played the  role of Mr. Rawal who is Leela's father in Jaane Kya Hoga Rama Re on Life OK.

Personal life

Mishra studied at Air Force Balbharti in New Delhi. Mishra married his co-star Manini Mishra from Sanjivani on 30 December 2004 and the couple have a daughter named Dianoor.

Television

References

External links

Living people
People from Delhi
Indian male television actors
Indian male soap opera actors
Reality dancing competition contestants
Participants in Indian reality television series
1978 births